A Little Princess (1973) is a lost BBC television mini-series directed by Derek Martinus, based upon the 1905 novel A Little Princess by Frances Hodgson Burnett.  This version is noted for being very faithful to the original novel. It ran on the Sunday tea-time slot, where at the time the BBC often ran faithful adaptations of classic novels.

It was originally broadcast in six 25-minute episodes on BBC 1, 18 February to 25 March 1973. It was also licensed for distribution by 20th Century-Fox Television, for use on ABC affiliates in the United States.

Despite its success and faithfulness to the novel, the master videotapes for the adaptation were wiped after broadcast, and no copies are known to exist.

Cast
 Ruth Dunning - Miss Minchin
 Deborah Makepeace - Sara Crewe
 Gaynor Hodgson - Becky
 Margery Withers - Miss Amelia

References

External links

 
 

British television films
British children's films
Television shows based on American novels
Television shows based on British novels
Films based on A Little Princess
BBC television dramas
1970s children's films
Television series about princesses
Television shows set in India
Television shows set in the British Raj
Lost British films
Lost television shows
1970s British films